Mesopsocus helveticus is a species of Psocoptera from the Mesopsocidae family that can be found in Austria, Hungary, and Switzerland.

References

Mesopsocidae
Insects described in 1977
Psocoptera of Europe